Simon Hornblower, FBA (born 29 May 1949) is an English classicist and academic. He is Professor of Classics and Ancient History in the University of Oxford and senior research fellow of All Souls College, Oxford.

Biography
Born in 1949, he was educated at Eton College, where he was a King's Scholar; at Jesus College, Cambridge, where he took a first class in Part I of the Classical Tripos in 1969; and at Balliol College, Oxford, where he took first-class honours in Literae Humaniores in 1971 (BA and hence subsequently MA) and a DPhil in 1978 with a thesis entitled Maussollos of Karia.

In 1971, he was elected to a Prize Fellowship of All Souls College, Oxford, which he held until 1977. From 1978 until 1997, he was university lecturer in ancient history in the University of Oxford and fellow and tutor in classics at Oriel College, Oxford, including one year, 1994/95, in which he was a member of the Institute for Advanced Study in Princeton, New Jersey. He moved to University College London, where in 1998 he was appointed professor of classics and ancient history. In 2006 he was promoted with the title Grote Professor of Ancient History, retaining the title professor of classics.

He was elected a Fellow of the British Academy in 2004.

Hornblower was elected senior research fellow of All Souls College, Oxford, taking up his appointment in Michaelmas Term 2010. At the same time, the Recognition of Distinction Committee conferred upon him the title Professor of Classics and Ancient History.

Scholarship
His current interest is classical Greek historiography (especially Herodotus and Thucydides) and the relation between historical texts as literature and as history. He has published an historical and literary commentary on Thucydides in three volumes (Oxford University Press, 1991, 1996, 2008). His latest sole-authored book is Thucydides and Pindar: Historical Narrative and the World of Epinikian Poetry (Oxford University Press, 2004). He is also co-editor, with Professor Catherine Morgan of King's College London, of Pindar's Poetry, Patrons, and Festivals: From Archaic Greece to the Roman Empire (OUP, 2007), a collection of papers by experts on historical, literary, archaeological and anthropological aspects of Pindar and his world.

Since 1979, he has been involved with the Lexicon of Greek Personal Names and co-edited Greek Personal Names: Their Value as Evidence (Oxford University Press, 2000), a role in which he co-operated closely with Elaine Matthews.

In 1996, he co-edited the third edition of the Oxford Classical Dictionary. In 2012, he edited the fourth and most recent edition.

Bibliography

References

External links

Page at All Souls

1949 births
Living people
People educated at Eton College
Academics of University College London
Alumni of Jesus College, Cambridge
Alumni of Balliol College, Oxford
Historians of antiquity
Fellows of All Souls College, Oxford
British classical scholars
British historians
People associated with the History Department, University College London
Fellows of the British Academy
Fellows of Oriel College, Oxford
Institute for Advanced Study visiting scholars
Classical scholars of the University of Oxford